This is a List of telecommunications terminology and acronyms which relate to telecommunications.

C
 Coded set
 Customer office terminal

D
 Data forwarder
 Digital multiplex hierarchy
 Duplex

E
 Exempted addressee

F
 Frame synchronization
 Free-space optical communication
 Functional profile

G
 Group alerting and dispatching system

H
Hop
Horn
 Hybrid routing

M
 Mechanically induced modulation
 Micro-mainframe link
 Multiplexing

N
 Noise (signal processing)

P
 Plesiochronous digital hierarchy
 Primary station

R
 Radio receiver
 Ringaround

S
 Spatial application

T
 Transmission medium
 Transmitter

W
 Wireless mobility management

See also
 Federal Standard 1037C
 List of telecommunications encryption terms
 Outline of telecommunication
 Telecommunications

External links
"http://www.its.bldrdoc.gov/fs-1037/fs-1037c.htm"– Telecommunications: Glossary of Telecommunication Terms

References  

Technical terminology
Electronics lists